Minari Dam is an arch dam located in Shimane Prefecture in Japan. The dam is used for power production. The catchment area of the dam is 117.5 km2. The dam impounds about 32  ha of land when full and can store 3438 thousand cubic meters of water. The construction of the dam was started on 1950 and completed in 1953.

References

Dams in Shimane Prefecture
1953 establishments in Japan